Kal Qeysari-ye Olya (also Romanized as Kal Qeyṣarī-ye ‘Olyā) is a village in Rak Rural District, in the Central District of Kohgiluyeh County, Kohgiluyeh and Boyer-Ahmad Province, Iran. At the 2006 census, its population was 37, in 6 families.

References 

Populated places in Kohgiluyeh County